Bonnaya is a genus of flowering plants belonging to the family Linderniaceae.

Its native range is Eastern Tropical Africa, Madagascar, Tropical and Subtropical Asia to Northern Australia. .

Species:

Bonnaya aculeata 
Bonnaya antipoda 
Bonnaya cephalantha 
Bonnaya ciliata 
Bonnaya cowiei 
Bonnaya milindii 
Bonnaya multiflora 
Bonnaya oppositifolia 
Bonnaya peduncularis 
Bonnaya ruellioides 
Bonnaya sanpabloensis 
Bonnaya succosa 
Bonnaya tenuifolia 
Bonnaya veronicifolia 
Bonnaya zanzibarica

References

Linderniaceae
Lamiales genera